Conrad Stansilaus Dias (born 19 November 1969) is the judge of Kerala High Court. The High Court of Kerala is the highest court in the Indian state of Kerala and in the Union Territory of Lakshadweep. The High Court of Kerala is headquartered at Ernakulam, Kochi.

Early life
Dias was born in Ernakulam, Kerala, to Adv.R.G.Dias and Phyllis Dias. He is an Anglo-Indian. He did his schooling at the Kendriya Vidyalaya, Ernakulam. He secured his law degree from Government Law College, Thiruvananthapuram in 1992.

Career
Dias completed his law in 1992 and started practicing as a lawyer in the High Court of Kerala. He specialised in the fields of Civil, Constitutional, Family and Arbitration laws. He served as counsel for High Court of Kerala from 2016–2019; Retainer Standing Counsel for the Ministry of Railways from 2010 to 2019; Central Government Counsel from 2012- 2015; Standing Counsel for the Indian Oil Corporation from 2006–2019; member of the National Advisory Committee to the Ministry of Women and Child Development  2018 - 2019. He was appointed as amicus curiae by the High Court in several cases, including the Puttingal fireworks tragedy case. On 18 November 2019 he was appointed as additional judge of the High Court of Kerala. He was made a permanent judge of the High Court of Kerala on 25 May 2021.

References

External links
 High Court of Kerala

Living people
Judges of the Kerala High Court
21st-century Indian judges
1969 births
Indian judges
Government Law College, Thiruvananthapuram alumni